An election to Cork County Council took place on 27 June 1991 as part of that year's Irish local elections. 48 councillors were elected from eight electoral divisions by PR-STV voting for an eight-year term of office.

Results by party

Results by Electoral Area

Bandon

Cork North

Cork South

Kanturk

Mallow

Midleton

Skibbereen

Schull

External links
 Official website
 irishelectionliterature

1991 Irish local elections
1991